Karbi may refer to:

Places 
 Karbi, Armenia
 Karbi Anglong Plateau, an extension of the Indian Plate in Assam, India
 Karbi Anglong district, a district of Assam, north-eastern India

Other uses 
 Karbi people, an ethnic group of North-east India
 Karbi language, the Sino-Tibetan languages spoken by Karbi people
 Karbi languages, a branch of the Kuki-Chin group of Sino-Tibetan

See also

Karli (name)
Karri (disambiguation)

Language and nationality disambiguation pages